The 1992 CIS Indoor Athletics Championships was an international outdoor track and field competition for athletes from countries within the Commonwealth of Independent States. It was held on 1–2 February at CSKA Palace of Sports in Moscow, Russia. A total of 29 events were contested over two days. Women competed in the steeplechase for the first time. Highlights included an Asian record of 6.51 seconds by Vitaliy Savin in the men's 60 metres.

This was the only time the competition was held, precipitated by the dissolution of the Soviet Union in 1991 and the need to select athletes for the unified team at the 1992 European Athletics Indoor Championships. After 1992, the former Soviet states each sent their own national teams and held their own national championships. The indoor CIS competition was followed later that year by the outdoor 1992 CIS Athletics Championships, which served as the selection meet for the Unified Team at the 1992 Summer Olympics.

The men's heptathlon and women's pentathlon were held separately from the main competition, taking place in Saint Petersburg the following week.

Results

Men

Women

CIS Indoor Combined Events Championships
The CIS Indoor Combined Events Championships was held on 8–9 February in Saint Petersburg at the Winter Stadium.

Men

Women

Unified team selection

Men
60 m: Vitaliy Savin, Oleh Kramarenko
200 m: Aleksandr Goremykin
800 m: Anatoly Makarevich
1500 m: Sergey Melnikov
60 m hurdles: Aleksandr Markin
High jump: Aleksey Yemelin
Pole vault: Petr Bochkarev, Konstantin Semenov
Long jump: Dmitry Bagryanov, Vitaliy Kyrylenko
Triple jump: Leonid Voloshin, Vasiliy Sokov
Shot put: Oleksandr Bagach, Aleksandr Klimenko
Heptathlon: Lev Lobodin, Vitaliy Kolpakov
5000 m walk: Grigory Kornev, Frants Kostyukevich

Women
60 m: Zhanna Tarnopolskaya, Nadezhda Roshchupkina
200 m: Oksana Stepicheva, Natalya Voronova
400 m: Olha Bryzhina, Marina Shmonina, Yelena Golesheva
800 m: Inna Yevseyeva, Yelena Afanasyeva
1500 m: Yekaterina Podkopayeva, Lyubov Kremleva
3000 m: Tetyana Dorovskikh, Olena Vyazova
60 m hurdles: Lyudmila Narozhilenko
High jump: Yelena Yelesina
Long jump: Inessa Kravets, Larysa Berezhna
Triple jump: Inessa Kravets
Shot put: Natalya Lisovskaya, Anna Romanova
Pentathlon: Irina Belova, Tatyana Blokhina
3000 m walk: Alina Ivanova, Yelena Sayko

See also
1992 Russian Indoor Athletics Championships

References

Results
На стадионах страны и мира. Открытый чемпионат СНГ в помещении // Лёгкая атлетика : журнал. — 1992. — No. 4. — С. 23–24.

Soviet Indoor Athletics Championships
CIS Indoor Athletics Championships
CIS Indoor Athletics Championships
CIS Indoor Athletics Championships
1992 in Moscow
Sports competitions in Moscow
Athletics competitions in Russia
Athletics in Moscow
CIS Championships